Highland is the name of some places in the U.S. state of Indiana:
Highland, Lake County, Indiana
Highland, Vanderburgh County, Indiana
Highland, Vermillion County, Indiana
Highland, Washington County, Indiana

es:Highland (Condado de Lake, Indiana)
nl:Highland (Indiana)